Cadwell Park is a motor racing circuit in Lincolnshire, England,  south of Louth, owned and operated by MotorSport Vision, a business associated with former racing driver Jonathan Palmer.
Sited on former parkland across a steep-sided valley with dips and crests, the circuit features sharp changes in gradient, including one section called The Mountain where bikes can become airborne by up to several feet. Its mix of challenging corners has led to its nickname as the Mini-Nürburgring.

History 

His sons originally used the land for racing their own motorbikes against each other.

Originally the gravel-drives of the country estate measured , with tarmac and concrete being added in 1938, with widening and lengthening in 1953, and lengthened again in 1961 with the addition of the Donington Curve.

Around 30,000 spectators attended that particular race.

The track grew to the current  layout in 1962 and hosted the British F3 series the next May. Some of the bends are named after family members e.g. Mansfield, Charlie and Chris.

One of the biggest developments in the circuit's history occurred in January 2004, when Jonathan Palmer's MotorSport Vision company completed the purchase of Cadwell Park and the other Octagon venues (Brands Hatch, Oulton Park, and Snetterton). Palmer immediately implemented a programme of improvements to the venue, designed to heighten customer experiences both for spectators and competitors.

Racing usage
Competitively, Cadwell Park is primarily used for motorcycle racing, with the British Superbike Championship round being the biggest event on the circuit's calendar, held during an August weekend each year. In 2010, it hosted an additional BSB meeting on the weekend of 22/23 May.

Cadwell Park occasionally features in the British Superkart Championship calendar, having last done so in 2021. A new circuit lap record for any vehicle was set by driver Sam Moss in that year.

The circuit's track width is now generally considered too narrow for high level car races, although Club motorsport associations such as the BARC, HSCC and 750MC still hold meetings.

Current events

In addition to the August round of the British Superbike Championship, Cadwell Park also hosts two major historic events with the Vintage Sports Car Club's annual festival and the Wolds Trophy covering the post-war period.

The Vintage Motorcycle Club is a regular visitor, with the popular Modified Live car show event also on the calendar. The Cadwell Park season typically ends with stage rallying and fireworks.

During the week the circuit offers general test days and track days for cars and motorcycles, and can also be hired out for private use.

Other usage
Several tests and feature clips for the motoring program Fifth Gear have been filmed here. They frequently feature racing driver Tiff Needell.

In April 2009, musician and Pink Floyd drummer Nick Mason flew into the circuit by helicopter to drive his £1.5 million Ferrari 512.

In June 2015 the circuit was used as part of the course for pedal-cycling's British National Time Trial Championships.

Some racing scenes for the 2013 film Rush were filmed at Cadwell Park.

Top Gear used the circuit for a feature, aired in 2020, featuring former Formula One driver Damon Hill pitted against the regular Top Gear presenters, testing a Porsche, Aston Martin and Ferrari.

Stock Car racing
During the 1960s and 1970s, BriSCA Formula 1 Stock Cars attracted big crowds to Cadwell.  The gradient changes added excitement to the racing, as stock car drivers were accustomed to racing on flat  oval tracks of shale or tarmac; and likewise their cars' suspensions and gearing were set up for short flat ovals.

Race lap records
The fastest official race lap records at Cadwell Park are listed as:

Track records

References

External links

Motorsport Vision: Cadwell Park 
Map and circuit history at RacingCircuits.info
Radical SR8 smashes Cadwell Park Fastest Lap
A lap of Cadwell Park (video)
Matt Bell's SR3 Lap Record (video)
Div.1 Superkarts: Carl Hulme at Cadwell (video)

Motorsport venues in England
Sports venues in Lincolnshire